William Martin Watt (1889 – 26 May 1954) was a Scottish professional golfer. He won the Scottish Professional Championship in 1912 and tied for 8th place in the 1923 Open Championship.

Early life
Watt was born in 1889 in Dunbar, East Lothian, Scotland. He had four older golfing brothers: Jim, John, Robert and Davie.

Golf career
Watt enjoyed some success in the Scottish Professional Championship before World War I. He won the championship in 1912, was runner-up in 1908 and 1914 and was third in 1909, 1911 and 1913. His success in 1912 was at Dunbar, where he won by 5 strokes from his brother Davie, winning the first prize of £25. He tied with Robert Thomson in 1908 but lost the 36-hole playoff by 7 strokes.

The opening day of the 1910 Open Championship was abandoned because of rain but, when play resumed the following day, Watt started with a 74 and was tied for second place at the end of the first round. His second round of 82 dropped him down the field. He eventually finished tied for 32nd place. Later in 1910 Watt was runner-up in the first Perrier Water Assistant Professionals' Tournament at Bushey Hall Golf Club. The prizes for this tournament were "presented by the proprietors of Perrier Water", the winner receiving 20 guineas (£21) and a gold watch. The event was organised like the News of the World Match Play with regional qualifying over 36 holes and a knock-out stage for the 16 qualifiers. Watt was the Scottish qualifier, although there were only 4 entries. He met Willie Ritchie in the final. Ritchie had won the Southern section qualifying by a clear 7 strokes. Watt was 1 up after five holes but lost the next four holes. Ritchie also won the 11th and 13th and eventually won 5&4.

As well as winning the Scottish Professional Championship in 1912, Watt was also runner-up in the Dunlop Cup at North Berwick, 5 strokes behind Robert Thomson, and taking the £5 second prize. Watt reached the semi-final of the 1913 News of the World Match Play at Walton Heath Golf Club where he lost 3&2 to James Braid.

In late 1914 Watt moved south, becoming the professional at the new Woodcote Park Golf Club near Epsom, Surrey. He remained there until he retired in 1947. He enjoyed some success in the early 1920s and finished tied for 8th place in the 1923 Open Championship.

Death
Watt died in May 1954 aged 64. At the time he was living in Epsom, Surrey.

Tournament wins
1912 Scottish Professional Championship

Results in major championships

Note: Watt only played in The Open Championship.

NT = No tournament
CUT = missed the half-way cut
"T" indicates a tie for a place

Team appearances
England–Scotland Professional Match (representing Scotland): 1912, 1913

References

Scottish male golfers
People from Dunbar
Sportspeople from Epsom
1889 births
1954 deaths